Theodore Garland Jr. (born 28 November 1956) is a biologist specializing in evolutionary physiology at the University of California, Riverside.

Education 
Garland earned his B.S in zoology and M.S. in biology at the University of Nevada, Las Vegas, working with William Glen Bradley, a mammalogist, and his Ph.D. in Ecology and Evolutionary Biology at the University of California, Irvine under Albert F. Bennett, a comparative physiologist.

While in graduate school, he served as President of the Southern Nevada Herpetology Association. During his Ph.D. work, he recorded the maximum speed (34.6 km/h) of what to date remains the world's fastest lizard, Ctenosaura similis. Subsequently, he completed postdoctoral training at the University of Washington with Raymond B. Huey.

Career 
He was on the faculty at the University of Wisconsin–Madison for 14 years, served as a program director for the Population Biology and Physiological Ecology Program  at the National Science Foundation during 1991–1992, and is Professor of Biology at the University of California, Riverside.

Garland is the Editor in Chief for the journal Physiological and Biochemical Zoology, a former Topic Editor for Comprehensive Physiology, on the Editorial Advisory Board of  Zoology, and has been on the editorial boards of the Journal of Morphology, The American Naturalist, and Evolution. He is an associate director for the Network for Experimental Research on Evolution, a University of California Multicampus Research Program.

His major scientific contributions have been in the areas of lizard locomotor physiology and ecology, allometry, phylogenetic comparative methods; and the application of artificial selection experiments to understand the correlated evolution of physiology and behavior, as well as the physiological, neurobiological, and genetic bases of voluntary activity levels (physical exercise).

Awards
In 1983–84, he was a Visiting Fulbright Scholar at the University of Wollongong, Australia, hosted by Anthony J. Hulbert.

In 1991, he received a Presidential Young Investigator Award  from the National Science Foundation.

The University of Nevada, Las Vegas named him College of Sciences Alumnus of the Year  in April 2017.

Publications

Books
 Garland, T. Jr., and M. R. Rose, eds. 2009. Experimental Evolution: Concepts, Methods, and Applications of Selection Experiments. University of California Press, Berkeley, California. xvii + 730 pages. PDF file

Selected papers
 
 
 Garland, T. Jr., and S. C. Adolph. 1994. Why not to do two-species comparative studies: limitations on inferring adaptation. Physiological Zoology 67:797-828. PDF

References

External links 
 Academic Tree
 Google Scholar Citations Profile
 Garland Lab web page
 Garland publications 
 Publications on NCBI My Bibliography
 Publications on the High Runner mouse selection experiment
 Inquiry-Based Middle School Lesson Plan

1956 births
Living people
American physiologists
Evolutionary biologists
University of Nevada, Las Vegas alumni
University of California, Irvine alumni
University of Wisconsin–Madison faculty
University of California, Riverside faculty